Charmaine Chinapen (born 1987) is a beauty pageant contestant from Belize.  A student at the University of St. John's University (New York City), USA, she represented Belize in Miss World 2008, held on December 13 in Johannesburg, South Africa.  She was born in Curaçao, an island in the Netherlands Antilles, and moved to several countries before settling in Belize as her home at the age of nine, and became a citizen along with her immediate family.  She has one brother, Kevin; her father is in the banking industry, and her mother is her biggest supporter.

References

 https://web.archive.org/web/20110228133437/http://www.channel5belize.com/archive_detail_story.php?story_id=11850

1987 births
Living people
Belizean beauty pageant winners
Curaçao emigrants to Belize
Miss World 2008 delegates
St. John's University (New York City) alumni